Historic preservation (US), built heritage preservation or built heritage conservation (UK), is an endeavor that seeks to preserve, conserve and protect buildings, objects, landscapes or other artifacts of historical significance. It is a philosophical concept that became popular in the twentieth century, which maintains that cities as products of centuries’ development should be obligated to protect their patrimonial legacy. The term refers specifically to the preservation of the built environment, and not to preservation of, for example, primeval forests or wilderness.

Areas of professional, paid practice
Paid work, performed by trained professionals, in historic preservation can be divided into the practice areas of regulatory compliance, architecture and construction, historic sites/museums, advocacy, and downtown revitalization/rejuvenation; each of these areas has a different set of expected skills, knowledge, and abilities.

United States
In the United States, about 70% of professional, paid practice in historic preservation is in the area of regulatory compliance, which is driven by laws, regulations, and guidelines promulgated at the federal, state, and local levels. At the federal level, these include the National Historic Preservation Act of 1966 and associated regulations, such as Section 106 (54 USC 306108, formerly known as 36 CFR 800), National Register of Historic Places (54 USC 302101-302108), and the Secretary of the Interior's Standards (36 CFR 67); many states have laws that reference these federal regulations or create parallel regulations, using federal regulatory language. At the local level, preservation laws and regulations are known as "preservation ordinances" and define the need for private property owners to seek a "certificate of appropriateness" when making modifications to existing buildings that are listed in a local historical register. Refer to the table, below, for the full breakdown of various practice areas in the United States.

United Kingdom
According to a 2008 survey conducted by the National Heritage Training Group, the size of the built heritage conservation sector, and how its various specializations break down, is not known.

History

England
In England, antiquarian interests were a familiar gentleman's pursuit since the mid 17th century, developing in tandem with the rise in scientific curiosity. Fellows of the Royal Society were often also Fellows of the Society of Antiquaries.

Many historic sites were damaged as the railways began to spread across the UK,  these sites included Trinity Hospital and its church in Edinburgh, Furness Abbey, Berwick and Northampton Castle, as well as the ancient walls of York, Chester and Newcastle. In 1833 Berkhamsted Castle became the first historic site in England to be officially protected by statute, under the London and Birmingham Railway Acts of 18331837, though the new railway line in 1834 did demolish the castle's gatehouse and outer earthworks to the south.

In 1847 the Shakespeare Birthplace Trust was formed by a private Act of Parliament to prevent the Stratford property's sale to American showman P. T. Barnum.

Another early preservation event also occurred at Berkhamsted. In 1866, Lord Brownlow who lived at Ashridge House, tried to enclose the adjoining Berkhamsted Common with  steel fences in an attempt to claim it as part of his estate. In England from early Anglo-Saxon times, Common land was an area of land which the local community could use as a resource. Across England between 1660 and 1845, 7 million acres of Common land had been enclosed by private land owners by application to parliament. On the night of 6 March 1866, Augustus Smith MP led gangs of local folk and hired men from London's East End in direct action to break the enclosure fences and protect Berkhamsted Common for the people of Berkhamsted in what became known nationally as the Battle of Berkhamsted Common. In 1870, Sir Robert Hunter (later co-founder of the National Trust in 1895) and the Commons Preservation Society succeed in legal action that ensured protection of Berkhamsted Common and other open spaces threatened with enclosure. In 1926 the common was acquired by the National Trust.

By the mid 19th century, much of Britain's unprotected cultural heritage was being slowly destroyed. Even well-meaning archaeologists like William Greenwell excavated sites with virtually no attempt at their preservation, Stonehenge came under increasing threat by the 1870s. Tourists were chipping off parts of the stones or carving their initials into the rock. The private owners of the monument decided to sell the land to the London and South-Western Railway who stated that the monument was "not the slightest use to anyone now". John Lubbock, an MP and botanist emerged as the champion of the country's national heritage. In 1872 he personally bought private land that housed ancient monuments in Avebury, Silbury Hill and elsewhere, from the owners who were threatening to have them cleared away to make room for housing. Soon, he began campaigning in Parliament for legislation to protect monuments from destruction. This finally led to the legislative milestone under the Liberal government of William Gladstone of the Ancient Monuments Protection Act 1882. The first government appointed inspector for this job was the archaeologist Augustus Pitt-Rivers. This legislation was regarded by conservative political elements as a grave assault on the individual rights of property of the owner, and consequently, the inspector only had the power to identify endangered landmarks and offer to purchase them from the owner with his consent. The Act only covered ancient monuments and explicitly did not cover historic buildings or structures. In 1877 the Society for the Protection of Ancient Buildings was founded by the Arts and Crafts designer William Morris to prevent the destruction of historic buildings, followed by the National Trust in 1895 that bought estates from their owners for preservation.

The Ancient Monuments Protection Act 1882 had only given legal protection to prehistoric sites, such as ancient tumuli. The Ancient Monuments Protection Act 1900 took this further by empowering the government's Commissioners of Work and local County Councils to protect a wider range of properties. Further updates were made in 1910.

Tattershall Castle, Lincolnshire, a medieval manor house had been put up for sale in 1910 with its greatest treasures, the huge medieval fireplaces, still intact. However, when an American bought the house they were ripped out and packaged up for shipping. The former viceroy of India, George Curzon, 1st Marquess Curzon of Kedleston, was outraged at this cultural destruction and stepped in to buy back the castle and reinstall the fireplaces. After a nationwide hunt for them they were finally found in London and returned. He restored the castle and left it to the National Trust on his death in 1925. His experience at Tattershall influenced Lord Curzon to push for tougher heritage protection laws in Britain, which saw passage as the Ancient Monuments Consolidation and Amendment Act 1913.

The new structure involved the creation of the Ancient Monuments Board to oversee the protection of such monuments. Powers were given for the board, with Parliamentary approval, to issue preservation orders to protect monuments, and extended the public right of access to these. The term "monument" was extended to include the lands around it, allowing the protection of the wider landscape.

The National Trust

The National Trust was founded in 1894 by Octavia Hill, Sir Robert Hunter, and Hardwicke Canon Rawnsley as the first organisation of its type in the world. Its formal purpose is: The preservation for the benefit of the Nation of lands and tenements (including buildings) of beauty or historic interest and, as regards lands, for the preservation of their natural aspect, features and animal and plant life. Also the preservation of furniture, pictures and chattels of any description having national and historic or artistic interest.

In the early days, the Trust was concerned primarily with protecting open spaces and a variety of threatened buildings; its first property was Alfriston Clergy House and its first nature reserve was Wicken Fen. Its first archaeological monument was White Barrow. The focus on country houses and gardens, which now comprise the majority of its most visited properties, came about in the mid 20th century, when it was realised that the private owners of many of these properties were no longer able to afford to maintain them.

The Town and Country Planning Act 1944 and the Town and Country Planning Act 1990 took steps toward historic preservation on an unprecedented scale. Concern about the demolition of historic buildings arose in institutions such as the pressure group the Society for the Preservation of Historic Buildings, which appealed against demolition and neglect on a case-by-case basis.

English Heritage
English Heritage formed in 1983, is a registered charity that looks after the National Heritage Collection in England. This comprises over 400 of England's historic buildings, monuments and sites spanning more than 5,000 years of history. Within its portfolio are Stonehenge, Dover Castle, Tintagel Castle and the best preserved parts of Hadrian's Wall.

Originally English Heritage was the operating name of an executive non-departmental public body of the British Government, officially titled the Historic Buildings and Monuments Commission for England, that ran the national system of heritage protection and managed a range of historic properties. It was created to combine the roles of existing bodies that had emerged from a long period of state involvement in heritage protection. In 1999 the organisation merged with the Royal Commission on the Historical Monuments of England and the National Monuments Record (England), bringing together resources for the identification and survey of England's historic environment. On 1 April 2015, English Heritage was divided into two parts: Historic England, which inherited the statutory and protection functions of the old organisation, and the new English Heritage Trust, a charity that would operate the historic properties, and which took on the English Heritage operating name and logo. The British government gave the new charity an £80 million grant to help establish it as an independent trust, although the historic properties remained in the ownership of the state.

National Parks

United States

In the United States one of the first historic preservation efforts was the
Washington's Headquarters State Historic Site, in Newburgh, New York. This property has the distinction of being the first-ever property designated and operated as a historic site by a U.S. state, having been so since 1850.

Another early historic preservation undertaking was that of George Washington's Mount Vernon in 1858. Founded in 1889, the Richmond, Virginia-based Preservation Virginia (formerly known as the Association for the Preservation of Virginia Antiquities) was the United States' first statewide historic preservation group. The American Scenic and Historic Preservation Society was formed in 1895 as the first American organization of its kind in the United States that did not limit its activities to a single historic place or object. The Society operated as a national organization to: protect the natural scenery and the preservation of historic landmarks; to preserve landmarks and records of the past or present; to erect memorials and promote appreciation of the scenic beauty of America.

Charles E. Peterson was an influential figure in the mid-20th century establishing the Historic American Buildings Survey (HABS), advising on the establishment of Independence National Historical Park, helping with the first graduate degree program in historic preservation in the United States at Columbia University, and author.

The architectural firm of Simons & Lapham (Albert Simons and Samuel Lapham) was an influential supporter of the nation's first historic preservation ordinance in Charleston, South Carolina in 1930, affording that city a regulatory means by which to prevent the destruction of its historic building stock. In 1925, efforts to preserve the historic buildings of the French Quarter in New Orleans led to the creation of the Vieux Carré Commission and later, to the adoption of a historic preservation ordinance.

The US National Trust for Historic Preservation, another privately funded non-profit organization, began in 1949 with a handful of structures and has developed goals that provide "leadership, education, advocacy, and resources to save America's diverse historic places and revitalize our communities" according to the Trust's mission statement.  In 1951 the Trust assumed responsibility for its first museum property, Woodlawn Plantation in northern Virginia. Twenty-eight sites in all have subsequently become part of the National Trust, representing the cultural diversity of American history.  In New York City, the destruction of Pennsylvania Station in 1964 shocked many nationwide into supporting preservation. The 1960s proved advantageous with new laws and international agreements extending preservation "from ancient monuments to whole districts and buildings a few decades old." On an international level, the New York-based World Monuments Fund was founded in 1965 to preserve historic sites all over the world.

Under the direction of James Marston Fitch, the first advanced-degree historic preservation program began at Columbia University in 1964. It became the model on which most other graduate historic preservation programs were created. Many other programs were to follow before 1980: M.A. in Preservation Planning from Cornell (1975); M.S. in Historic Preservation from the University of Vermont (1975); M.S. in Historic Preservation Studies from Boston University (1976); M.S. in Historic Preservation from Eastern Michigan University (1979) and M.F.A. in Historic Preservation was one of the original programs at Savannah College of Art & Design. James Marston Fitch also offered guidance and support towards the founding of the Master of Preservation Studies Degree within the Tulane School of Architecture in 1996. The M.Sc. in Building Conservation degree program is offered by the School of Architecture at Rensselaer Polytechnic Institute in Troy, New York. In 2005, Clemson University and the College of Charleston created an M.S. degree program based in Charleston, SC. The first undergraduate programs (B.A.) appeared in 1977 from Goucher College and Roger Williams University (then called Roger Williams College), followed by Mary Washington College in 1979.  there were more than fifty historic preservation programs offering certificates, associate, bachelor's, and master's degrees in the United States. Under the direction of Jorge Otero-Pailos, the first PhD in Historic Preservation in the United States was founded at Columbia Graduate School of Architecture, Planning and Preservation in 2018.

National Register of Historic Places

National Historic Landmark

Historic districts

A historic district in the United States is a group of buildings, properties, or sites that have been designated by one of several entities on different levels as historically or architecturally significant. Buildings, structures, objects and sites within a historic district are normally divided into two categories, contributing and non-contributing. Districts greatly vary in size, some having hundreds of structures while others have just a few.

The U.S. federal government designates historic districts through the U.S. Department of Interior, under the auspices of the National Park Service. Federally designated historic districts are listed on the National Register of Historic Places. Historic districts allows rural areas to preserve their characters through historic preservation programs. These include "Main Street" programs that can be used to redevelop rural downtowns. Using historic preservation programs as an economic development tool for local governments in rural areas has enabled some of those areas to take advantage of their history and develop a tourism market that in turn provides funds for maintaining an economic stability that these areas would not have seen otherwise.

A similar concept exists in the United Kingdom: a Conservation area is designated in accordance with the Planning (Listed Buildings and Conservation Areas) Act 1990 in order to protect a zone in which there are buildings of architectural or cultural heritage interest.

National Parks

The Department of the Interior designated several areas of Morristown, New Jersey as the first historic park in the United States national park system. It became designated as the Morristown National Historical Park. The community had permanent settlements that date to 1715, is termed the military capital of the American Revolution, and contains many designations of sites and locations. The park includes three major sites in Morristown.

In the United Kingdom, James Bryce the ambassador to the US praised the system of National Parks and campaigned to have them introduced in Great Britain. Little came of it until mounting public pressure during the early 20th century from the Ramblers' Association and other groups led to the National Parks and Access to the Countryside Act 1949.

Australia

All of Australia's major cities have had historic or heritage preservation establishments and legislation in place since the mid to late 1970s, though destruction or outright demolition of historic buildings continues in most Australian cities to this day, subject to council or planning approval, particularly outside of the city centres in historic neighbourhoods. Melbourne was founded in 1835 and grew enormously in wealth and prosperity following the 1850s gold rush, which resulted in a construction boom: large edifices were erected to serve as public buildings such as libraries, court houses, schools, churches, and offices. This led to a period where Melbourne became known as "Marvellous Melbourne", boasting the largest collection of Victorian architecture outside of England. However, in the years that followed, and as the thousands of Australian soldiers arrived back from the battlefields following the end of World War I there emerged a sense of renewed pride and a willingness to forget the dark days of war and distance Australian from its Victorian origins, considered "unfashionable" or "outdated" by some. The Council of the City of Melbourne was no doubt buoyed by this new nationalistic pride and put in place schemes to modernize the city which included increasing the building height limit and removing some of the Victorian era cast ironwork.
In the years leading up to World War II the Whelan the Wrecker firm had already pulled down thousands of structures in both the city and surrounding suburbs, as Melbourne became particularly conscious of International Modernism. James Paul Whelan's obituary of 1938 suggests that his company had the task of demolishing up to 98% of buildings marked for removal in the city alone. The rise of this International Modernism saw a new approach that valued replacing older, elaborate inefficient buildings with new ones. An early example of this was a City of Melbourne by-law in 1954 that mandated the demolition of all posted cast-iron verandas, thought to be dangerous as well as old fashioned, in order to 'clean up' the city before the 1956 Summer Olympics.

Sydney (Australia's oldest city) was also affected by the International Modernism period and also suffered an extensive loss of its Victorian architecture, something that subsisted well into the 1980s. From the 1950s onwards, many of Sydney's handsome sandstone and masonry buildings were wiped away by architects and developers who built "brown concrete monstrosities" in their place. The 1980s saw "uncomfortable pastiches of facades with no coherence and little artistic merit". Green bans in Australian cities such as Sydney and Melbourne came into effect in the 1970s and the Australian Heritage Commission (AHS), was established by the Federal Government in 1975 by the Australian Heritage Commission Act 1975 as the first body to manage natural and cultural heritage in Australia until its demise in 2004. It was responsible for the Register of the National Estate. The Australian National Heritage List was established in 2003. Controversy arose in 2016 in Melbourne after the historic Corkman Irish Pub was illegally demolished overnight, resulting in the State Planning Minister pursuing an order (via the Victorian Administrative Appeals Tribunal) for the two-story pub to be rebuilt. The site owners were fined AUD$1.325 million after pleading guilty to the process.

In the city of Adelaide, large public protests erupted in the 1980s regarding the 1983 campaign to save the Aurora Hotel in Hindmarsh Square, which had been recommended for listing on the city heritage register but refused because the site was to be redeveloped. The protest led to the emergence of Aurora Heritage Action, Inc. (AHA), which became the most vocal heritage lobby group in Adelaide during the decade, often working in cooperation with residents' associations and later the National Trust. While governments were urged to protect the traditional character of Adelaide, capital became more widely available for development. The large increase in property development from 1987 increased opposition to further demolition of Adelaide's historic buildings. Local councils and lobbyists alike aimed to expand the horizon of heritage to protect historic precincts across the city, even if buildings within those precincts did not warrant heritage listing. The Bannon government slowly responded to public demand and introduced historic (conservation) zones through a revision to the Planning Act (1982) in 1989. Not regulated by the Planning Act, the City of Adelaide endeavoured to create on a similar scheme, which became known as the townscape initiative, facilitating one of the most destructive political debates in the council's history.

Canada

In Canada, the phrase "heritage preservation" is sometimes seen as a specific approach to the treatment of historic places and sites, rather than a general concept of conservation. "Conservation" is taken as the more general term, referring to all actions or processes that are aimed at safeguarding the character-defining elements of a cultural resource so as to retain its heritage value and extend its physical life.

Historic objects in Canada may be granted special designation by any of the three levels of government: the central government, the provincial governments, or a municipal government.
The Heritage Canada Foundation acts as Canada's lead advocacy organisation for heritage buildings and landscapes.

The Netherlands 
Victor de Stuers is widely considered the man who started historic preservation in the Netherlands. In 1875 the first national department for conservation was established and de Stuers was appointed as the first legal secretary at the Ministry of Home Affairs as chief of the brand new Department of Arts and Sciences. He was the driving force behind Monumentenzorg (Foundation for Historic Preservation), helped found the Rijksmuseum (National Museum) and the Rijksarchief (National Archives).

However, it was not until the 20th century that there was national legislation on historic preservation. In 1961 the Monumentenwet (“Monuments Act”) was passed. It defined that any physical building or space that was at least fifty years old and “which are of general interest because of their beauty, their meaning to science or their social value” and must thus be preserved. In 1988 this Act was replaced by the Monumentenwet 1988 (“Monuments Act 1988”) and in 2015 by the Erfgoedwet (“Heritage Law”).

In 1973, the NGO Monumentenwacht (“Monument Watch”) was founded with the purpose of providing preventative measures of maintenance for historic buildings. As the majority of the historic preservation programs in the Netherlands, this program is decentralized, managed on the provincial level. Owners of heritage buildings can subscribe to the services of Monumentenwacht and receive regular visits for inspection. The costs are covered through a combination of national and provincial subsidies.

A special kind of preservation that takes place in the Netherlands is the preservation of maritime heritage. Maritime trade was the Dutch specialty which shaped much of their culture and as a country that is 50% under sea level the Dutch history is closely intertwined with water. There are maritime museums in both Amsterdam and Rotterdam that tell the story of the Dutch maritime heritage, but there is not much legal documentation on how to preserve it. For example, according to Sarah Dromgoole, shipwrecks from The Dutch East India Company are found all around the world, which are still property of the Netherlands, but the Dutch government rarely takes responsibility for this property that is found outside of their territory.

North Macedonia 
In North Macedonia, historic preservation falls under the overarching category of cultural heritage preservation according to the Law on Protection of Cultural Heritage (Закон за заштита на културното наследство). According to this law, which the Macedonian Parliament approved in March 2004, there are three types of cultural heritage: immovable, movable, and intangible. Historical preservation is represented by the protection of monuments and monumental entireties under immovable cultural heritage, and historical items under movable cultural heritage.

Although this law was the first nationwide establishment of regulations for historic preservation since North Macedonia gained independence from Yugoslavia on September 8, 1991, several organizations throughout the 20th century have encompassed efforts of historic preservation.

The “Central office for protection of cultural monuments and natural rarities of the Socialist Republic of Macedonia” has existed since 1949. In 1960, the Central Office was renamed to “National office for protection of cultural monuments”, and granted the status of an independent cultural institution, with authority to execute activities of historic preservation. After the establishment of the Law on Protection of Cultural Heritage in 2004, the Ministry of Culture once again renamed the office to “National center for conservation” and narrowed down its responsibilities to dealing solely with preservation of immovable cultural heritage.

Other organizations which have contributed to the efforts of historic preservation are the Macedonian National Committee of ICOMOS and the NI Institute for Protection of Monuments of Culture and Museum-Ohrid.

The International Council on Monuments and Sites (ICOMOS) established their branch in North Macedonia in 1995 through the initiative of 43 conservationists from Macedonia. The guiding principles of the Macedonian National Committee of ICOMOS are raising the national consciousness about the importance of historic and cultural heritage, decentralization of the discourse about heritage, and effective monitoring of the status of cultural and historic heritage in the country.

The NI Institute for Protection of Monuments of Culture and Museum – Ohrid is the second oldest institutions for historical preservation established in 1952. In 1956 the institute was granted authority to protect movable and immovable cultural and historic heritage in the Ohrid region. The institute has since executed numerous efforts for historic preservation, most notably aiding the recognition of the city of Ohrid as a UNESCO site of cultural heritage in 1979.

Today, the main authority for historic preservation is the Cultural Heritage Protection Office (Управа за заштита на културно наследство). The Office is an independent governmental organization under the Ministry of Culture, divided into three departments:
Identification, Protection and Use of Cultural Heritage
Prevention and Supervision
Documentation, International Cooperation and Administrative Affairs

lsrael 
In Israel, there are currently two laws concerning historic preservation, Antiquities Law of the State of Israel (1978) and Planning and Building Law (1965). Both laws were adapted from the British law that was implemented during the British Mandate of Palestine.

However, these laws are not comprehensive and limited in scope: the Antiquities Law only applies itself to buildings or artifacts dated before 1700 BC. So while efforts discovering and protecting anything older than 1700 BC are well protected, anything from later historical periods is not under the protection of this law. The Planning and Building Law discusses the overall management and regulation of land use in Israel. It has been through several changes and amendments specifically regarding preservation, but over the years it hasn't been enforced and many historical sites were destroyed, as the state was prioritizing developmental and economic interests.

During the 1960s, the issue of preservation was gaining public awareness, and as a response to the destruction of Herzliya Hebrew Gymnasium (one of the first educational institutions in Israel) in 1959, a wave of shock and anger led to extensive public debate.

In 1984, The Council for Conservation of Heritage Sites in Israel was established, at the recommendation of the Knesset and the Committee of Education. Its aims include locating remains of historic settlements, protect and conserve them as well as developing conservation principles that are specific to Israel's historic situations and are aligned with international standards. The council used to operate under the Society for the Protection of Nature in Israel but in 2008 registers as an independent non-profit. Today, it is the organization responsible for the most historical preservation endeavors as well as efforts to add amendments to existing laws to provide a comprehensive and effective framework for preservation in Israel.

A different, separate effort in preservation comes from the Israeli Defense Force (IDF). The IDF surveyed 94 military bases and found that about 80 of them include sites worth preserving, and for each of these bases there is a preservation plan. The IDF is working towards maintaining these building as well as communicating their value to the soldiers in these bases. Buildings include Knights Templar sites, old military bases used by the British or German or buildings from the Ottoman period.

Policy-making institutions

UNESCO (international) 

According to UNESCO's 1972 World Heritage Convention, landscapes and sites of outstanding universal value can be designated as World Heritage Sites. The World Heritage Convention encompasses historic preservation under the category of “cultural heritage”. According to Article 1 of the convention, monuments, groups of buildings, and sites “which are of outstanding universal value from the point of view of history, art or science” are to be designated cultural heritage.

A requirement of such designation is that the designating nation has appropriate legal, scientific, technical, administrative and financial measures in place to identify, protect, conserve, present, and rehabilitate world heritage sites. However, according to Article 6 of the convention, while sovereignty of the State where the site is located is not to be compromised, the State acknowledges that protection of heritage sites is a duty of the entire international community.

The World Heritage convention's counterpart, The World Heritage Committee, is the body responsible for the practical implementation of the convention as well as managing and deciding how to use the World Heritage Fund. The committee also gets to have the final say when determining whether a property will be included in the World Heritage List.

The Committee meets once a year and includes representatives from 21 states that are part of the States Parties. Yearly reports are available to the public on the World Heritage website and include outlines of decisions made, outcomes, working documents and various reports.

International partner of UNESCO is Blue Shield International. From a national and international perspective, there are many cooperations with Blue Shield organizations and with United Nations peacekeeping to ensure the sustainable existence of cultural assets.

Unique to the United States is the requirement in federal law, stipulated in the amended National Historic Preservation Act of 1966, that all owners of property that would be designated as World Heritage must provide consent to this treatment. Functionally, this is the reason why, out of all signatories to the World Heritage Convention, the US has no urban World Heritage Sites because it is impossible to gain 100% owner consent for sites with multiple, privately owned properties. The majority of World Heritage sites in the US is owned by the federal government.

International Council on Monuments and Sites (ICOMOS) (international) 
The International Council on Monuments and Sites, through the creation of international preservation/conservation doctrine, promulgates international guidelines for the treatment of historic buildings and places.

National Park Service (US) 
Under the National Historic Preservation Act of 1966 (and, as amended), the United States Secretary of the Interior is required to create and maintain a National Register of Historic Places; support, through grants and training, state historic preservation offices; facilitate the implementation of the federal historic rehabilitation tax credit; implement the World Heritage Convention; and provide training and education in historic preservation. The Secretary of the Interior delegated all of these responsibilities to the National Park Service. The National Park Service is responsible for creating and implementing most of federal preservation policy in the US, including the National Register, Secretary of the Interior's Standards, and training qualifications for professionals.

Advisory Council on Historic Preservation (ACHP) (US) 
The National Historic Preservation Act of 1966 (NHPA) also created a new federal agency, the Advisory Council on Historic Preservation, which consists of a chair and members of the public appointed by the US President. Other members of the ACHP are statutorily appointed. The ACHP's mission, per the NHPA is to "promote the preservation, enhancement, and sustainable use of our nation's diverse historic resources, and advise the President and the Congress on national historic preservation policy." The ACHP is also responsible for implementing the regulations for Section 106 review (i.e., "environmental review") under the NHPA.

Historic England (UK) 
Historic England is an executive non-departmental public body of the British Government sponsored by the Department for Digital, Culture, Media and Sport. It is tasked with protecting the historic environment of England by preserving and listing historic buildings, scheduling ancient monuments, registering historic Parks and Gardens and by advising central and local government.

Parks Canada (Canada) 
Parks Canada, which is part of the Government of Canada, manages the country's 48 National Parks, three National Marine Conservation Areas, 172 National Historic Sites, one National Urban Park, and one National Landmark. Parks Canada is mandated to "protect and present nationally significant examples of Canada's natural and cultural heritage, and foster public understanding, appreciation, and enjoyment in ways that ensure their ecological and commemorative integrity for present and future generations".

Challenges

Demographics of paid professionals, volunteers, and students in the field 
The historic preservation field is one of the least diverse, in terms of race and ethnicity, of any of the built environment professions. 99% of preservation practitioners are white; 85% of students in higher education historic preservation programs identify as white/Non-Hispanic, 1.0% identify as American Indian, 2.3% identify as Asian, 2.8% identify as African American, and 6.4% identify as Hispanic or Latino; there are no African American people, indigenous people, and essentially no people of color, who are tenured or tenure track faculty with at least a 50% teaching appointment in historic preservation degree programs (as of 2018); and most people who volunteer in preservation commissions are white.

Racial, ethnic, and gender bias in paid historic preservation practice 
Many historic preservation and cultural resource management scholars, such as Erica Avrami, Sara Bronin, Gail Dubrow, Jamesha Gibson, Ned Kaufman, Thomas King, Michelle Magalong, Kenyatta McLean, Sharon Milholland, Andrea Roberts, and Jeremy Wells, have presented evidence that a significant part of historic preservation practice remains biased toward people who identify as white, male, non-Latino, and who have wealth. This bias is also ingrained in the doctrine, laws, regulations, and guidelines that drive about three-quarters of the paid practice in the field.

Lack of research that addresses the practice of historic preservation 
In the United States, unlike other built environment disciplines (i.e., architecture, planning, interior design, landscape architecture), there is no tradition of intra-disciplinary research in the field that specifically addresses the practice of historic preservation, especially in relation to policy, which is its largest driver of work. Most research by preservation scholars addresses architectural history, but fails to address preservation policy, generally, including diversity, inclusion, equity, and social justice as well as topics related to community engagement and planning. Noted historic preservation scholar and exception to this rule, Ned Kaufman, refers to this phenomenon as preservation's "resistance to research" in relation to the field's inability to reflect on itself in terms of failures and successes:

As of 2022, in the US, there has never been a research center, research funding (government, foundation, or otherwise), or program, of any kind, that specifically attempts to provide answers as to the effectiveness of existing preservation policies, unintended impacts of preservation policies, and possible policy alternatives. Some scholars believe that the lack of intra-disciplinary historic preservation research is due to an anti-intellectual bias in the field that privileges exigency and physical interventions over scholarly reflection.

Climate change 
Historic preservation assumes that it is possible to control the physical reality of a building or place through continual interventions in order to sustain the material, form, and meaning associated with such places. Climate change, especially in relation to sea level rise and associated weather events (e.g., hurricanes) threatens many historic buildings and places. In many cases, buildings cannot be saved in place due to these issues; preservation doctrine and, in some cases, regulations, prevents moving buildings to higher ground without an associated loss of historical integrity (or historical authenticity), which present a irreconcilable conundrum that the field has yet to resolve.

People-centered preservation 
In the early 2000s, a series of publications on "values-centered" preservation by the Getty Conservation Institute helped to catalyze a scholarly debate on the underlying values that drive the historic preservation enterprise, especially in relation to the public and policy (e.g., laws, regulations, guidelines). Values-centered preservation was, in turn, preceded by earlier discussions in archaeology, in the 1990s, on the need to move from processual archaeology to postprocessual archaeology. What both of these movements advocate is a move from positivism and scientism in the practice of identifying, interpreting, and preserving/conserving movable and immovable heritage toward more emancipatory ontological orientations centered in the social sciences. People-centered preservation embraces the idea that the values and meanings held by the public for their own heritage, as a form of local knowledge, has as much significance as the values and meanings held by conventionally trained experts, such as architectural historians and archaeologists. People-centered preservation embraces the concept of the "Authorized Heritage Discourse" (AHD), established by Laurajane Smith in her book, Uses of Heritage. The AHD describes a system of communication used in built heritage practice and policy in which "the proper care of heritage, and its associated values, lies with the experts, as it is only they who have the abilities, knowledge and understanding to identify the innate value and knowledge contained at and within historically important sites and places." The AHD forms the core of preservation policy created and sustained by local, state, and federal government.

Many of the concepts inherent in people-centered preservation align with the need to address deficits in diversity, inclusion, equity, and justice in policy and practice.

While the US National Trust for Historic Preservation has publicly embraced people-centered preservation, in the United States, no local, state, or federal agency has issued any publications, guidance, or recommendations related to people-centered preservation and there have been no policy changes. In the UK, however, in 2000, the Secretary of State for Culture Media and Sport and the Secretary of State for the Environment, Transport and the Regions published The Power of Place, which began to open policy discussions around values-based preservation and the introduction of social science concepts in built heritage conservation practice. This was followed by Heritage Protection for the 21st Century, published by the Department for Culture, Media and Sport, which continued to refine policy reform arguments in the treatment of the historic environment in the UK. These publications, and the resulting public debate, did result in some policy changes that the UK government made to move practice related to the conservation of the historic environment toward a people-centered orientation.

Other challenges 
Although preservation efforts can have benefits for the owners of historical buildings, such as tax cuts and subsidies, there are also drawbacks.

One such drawback is that after a neighborhood has been designated to be historically preserved, there is less construction. On the long term this can affect the value of property and investment in housing, both in the neighborhood itself and the neighborhoods directly surrounding it.

A second concern that has been raised is that buildings that need to be historically preserved are sometimes still inhabited. In some cases their inability to make changes to the building can lead to dangerous or unhealthy situations for residents.

It is not true that nothing could be changed or renovated, but the owner of the building would need to ask permission at the appropriate preservation society, slowing the process down severely. The exact policies are country dependent.Local historical and political realities need to be considered to preserve heritage.

Historic objects in galleries, museums and archives face the challenge from fine particulates representing an aesthetic issue and an agent of chemical degradation.

Influential, historical people
 Eugène Viollet-le-Duc (1814–1879): French architect who restored Gothic buildings and believed that restoration could improve on the past.
 Ann Pamela Cunningham (1816–1875): influential in saving Mount Vernon (plantation) from demolition and founding the Mount Vernon Ladies' Association, one of the first preservation organizations in the United States (est. 1854).
 John Ruskin (1819–1900): English art critic who established the basic theory of preservation (retention of status quo); was a staunch supporter of chattel slavery.
 Augustus Pitt Rivers (1827–1900): Britain's first Inspector of Ancient Monuments.
 John Lubbock (1834–1913): campaigned for legal protection for ancient monuments and saved Avebury from destruction at the hand of its private owners.
 William Morris (1834–1896): English designer and writer who founded the Society for the Protection of Ancient Buildings.
 Camillo Boito (1836–1914): Italian architect who tried to reconcile the conflicting views of Viollet-le-Duc and Ruskin, inspiring modern legislation on restoration in several countries
 Victor de Stuers (1843–1916): Dutch art historian, lawyer, civil servant and politician. First legal secretary at the Ministry of Home Affairs as chief of the brand new Department of Arts and Sciences.
 George Curzon (1859–1925): British Viceroy of India who preserved Tattershall Castle, Lincolnshire and was an influential sponsor of the Ancient Monuments Consolidation and Amendment Act 1913.
 William Sumner Appleton (1874–1947):  Founder of the Society for the Preservation of New England Antiquities (now Historic New England) in 1910, and widely considered as the U.S.'s first professional preservationist. Was a eugenicist that promoted historic preservation as a way of showing that northern European-derived culture was superior to the culture of other racial and ethnic groups. 
 Charles E. Peterson (1906–2004): considered to be the "founding father" of historic preservation in the United States.
 James Marston Fitch (1909–2000): educator, author, critic and design practitioner made a major contribution to the philosophical basis of the modern preservation movement and trained and inspired generations of preservationists.
 William J. Murtagh: first Keeper of the National Register of Historic Places in the United States and significant contributor to the literature of the discipline.
 Lee H. Nelson: worked for Charles E. Peterson at the National Park Service's Historic American Buildings Survey and helped to formulate national policies on historic preservation.
 Walter Muir Whitehill: Chairman of the Whitehill Report in the late 1960s, which established the first guidelines for higher education historic preservation programs.
 Richard Nickel: American preservationist who saved architectural elements from Louis Sullivan buildings.
Harriet Tubman (1822–1913): purchased 25 acres to erect a Home for the elderly, this site would eventually serve as a memorial to her legacy.
Mary McLeod Bethune (1875-1955): involved in many efforts to preserve Afro-American historic sites, established an archive on Afro-American women's history, and provided funds to key organizations with similar goals.
Madam C.J. Walker (1867–1919): gave the single largest contribution for the preservation of the Frederick Douglas Home.
Maggie Lena Walker (1864–1934)

Professional organisations
 American Institute for Conservation
 American Institute of Architects
 American Planning Association
 International Council on Monuments and Sites
 Latinos in Heritage Conservation 
State historic preservation office
 Society of Architectural Historians
 National Trust
 English Heritage
 Society for the Protection of Ancient Buildings
 Landmark Trust

See also

Adaptive reuse
Architectural conservation
Athens Charter, doctrinal text
Barcelona Charter, doctrinal text
Building restoration
Cadw
Cultural heritage management
Cultural resources management
Diversity and inclusion
Historic garden conservation
Historic Scotland
List of historic houses
Principles of Intelligent Urbanism
Racial bias
Ship of Theseus, a philosophical problem regarding identity of preservation and replacement
Social justice
Space archaeology
Sustainable Preservation
Venice Charter, doctrinal text
:Category:Demolished buildings and structures
:Category:Heritage organizations
:Category:Historic preservation organizations

References

Bibliography

 
 Avrami, E., Leo, C.-N., & Sanchez, A. S. (2018). "Confronting Exclusion; Redefining the Intended Outcomes of Historic Preservation." Change Over Time, Vol. 8, No. 1.: 102–120.
 
 
 Carughi, Ugo, and Visone, Massimo. Time Frames: Conservation Policies for Twentieth-Century Architectural Heritage. New York-London: Routledge, 2017, .
 
 
 
 
 McLean, Kenyatta. (2020). Reclaiming Time and Space: Bringing Historical Preservation into the Future. Master’s thesis, MIT.
 
 Page, Max & Randall Mason (eds.). Giving Preservation a History. New York: Routledge, 2004.
 Price, Nicholas Stanley et al. (eds.). Historical and Philosophical Issues in the Conservation of Cultural Heritage. Los Angeles: The Getty Conservation Institute, 1996.
 Roberts, A. R. (2020). "The End of Bootstraps and Good Masters: Fostering Social Inclusion by Creating Counternarratives." In E. Avrami (Ed.), Preservation and Social Inclusion (pp. 109–122). Columbia University Press.
 Ruskin, John. The Seven Lamps of Architecture. New York: Dover Publications, 1989. Originally published, 1880. Important for preservation theory introduced in the section, "The Lamp of Memory."
 
 Stipe, Robert E. (ed.). A Richer Heritage: Historic Preservation in the Twenty-First Century. Chapel Hill, NC: The University of North Carolina Press, 2003.
 Tyler, Norman, Ted J. Ligibel, and Ilene R. Tyler. Historic Preservation: An Introduction to its History, Principles, and Practice. New York: W.W. Norton & Company, 2018.
 Viollet-le-Duc, Eugène Emmanuel. The Foundations of Architecture; Selections from the Dictionnaire Raisonné. New York: George Braziller, 1990. Originally published, 1854. Important for its introduction of restoration theory.
 Wells, Jeremy. (2021). "10 Ways Historic Preservation Policy Supports White Supremacy and 10 Ideas to End It." University of Maryland faculty papers.

External links

 An Overview of Preservation in the United States (US/ICOMOS)
 Archeology Laws: A Guide for Professionals (National Park Service)
 Standards and Guidelines for the Conservation of Historic Places in Canada
 Standards and Guidelines for Preservation in the United States

 
Architectural history
Cultural heritage
Museology
Conservation and restoration of cultural heritage